Philip Coulter may refer to:

 Phil Coulter (born 1942), Irish musician, songwriter and record producer
 Philip B. Coulter (born 1939), American political scientist